JKT48 Janken Competition 2016 is JKT48's first rock–paper–scissors competition, held at Balai Sarbini, Jakarta on 19 August 2016 to come (which coincides with the celebration of the birthday 23rd Jessica Veranda). This event will decide who will be the "senbatsu" members and center of the 14th JKT48 single to be released in the future.

The event featured a mini concert, and also the final round hosted by  who was an actor and presenter (including sports) and referee Valda Rompas, which is part of the MNC Talent Academy, the career event of the reality program "JKT48 Story" in RCTI, as well-trained talent show cooking MasterChef Indonesia 2015.

What is JKT48 Janken Competition? 
To be able to senbatsu, all the members JKT48 strive to do each. With the effort, the ability will be honed. With these capabilities, the members strive to provide the best and become senbatsu. In the world of entertainment, one of the important ability is 'good luck'. What if this time senbatsu single JKT48 determined purely on luck? In the JKT48 Janken Competition, the members will be against each other in a match suit – or which in Japanese is called janken. JKT48 Janken Competition held by the autumn tournament system. The outcome of each game is determined only from one suit.

When a member of the suit to win the game, he is entitled to move on to the next round. Participants were followed by members of Team J, KIII, and T. For training students and prospective students will have 5 members training through the preliminary round. This time all members have the same opportunity to win the seat in the single 14th JKT48.

Outline 

Participants 
The tournament was attended by all members of JKT48, plus a members of training students and prospective students training JKT48 who won the preliminary round local level. Total participants this time as many as 53 people, much less a person than the total participants of the tournament the first time (54). JKT48 members who are automatically eligible to compete in Balai Sarbini without going through the local level of preliminary round.

In the preliminary round among members of trainees and trainee candidates in this event at the JKT48 Theater on July 23, 2016, there were 5 members who qualified for the finals, which were Rissanda Putri Tuarissa (Trainee Candidate), Gabryela Marcelina (Trainee Candidate), Tan Zhi Hui Celine (Trainee), Adriani Elisabeth (Trainee), and Made Ranita Devi Ningtara (Trainee).

At the draw ceremony of JKT48 Janken, which took place on August 7, 2016, 50 members were present to determine the lottery numbers on the participants JKT48 Janken Competition of this year, including four members of trainees and trainee candidates, except Nabilah Ratna Ayu Azalia (Team J), Sendy Ariani (Team J), Saktia Oktapyani (Team KIII), and Rissanda Putri Tuarissa (Trainees).

In the final round of the Competition Janken JKT48 this year, all members participating JKT48, except Rissanda Putri Tuarissa (prospective Trainees) who do not participate in the event due to illness. However, Nabilah (Team J) to re-appear at the event, although his health is not 100% fit.

Rationing representative of JKT48 a commentator from calculations by Angga (Judges), Doni (Judges), and Putri (Assistant host).

Game rules 
 The match was held with the knockout.
 The game started call "Jan-ken-pon!", Without preceded call "Saisho wa gu ..." ("From the stone").
 Both players simultaneously show signs hands on the green table in the middle of the ring. If there is any doubt, the winner is decided by looking at the video footage.
 If event of a draw, the game is repeated from the starting position, without appeal "Aiko desho" ("draw").
 Players who waited in showing hand gestures to show signs of an opponent before her own hands is declared as fraudulent.
 Victory canceled when the player wins because earlier had seen a hand gesture of the opponent. If there is any doubt, the winner is decided by looking at the video footage.

Schedule 
 July 20, 2016: Start selling ticket Event JKT48 Janken Competition
 July 23, 2016: Preliminary round for Trainee Candidates and Trainees in JKT48 Theater
 August 7, 2016: Drawing even of Janken in JKT48 Theater (after the afternoon show "Pajama Drive" show in progress)
 August 19, 2016: Event JKT48 Janken Competition in Balai Sarbini

Bracket competition 
The winner's name is written in bold.

Abbreviation:
 J: Team J
 KIII: Team KIII
 T: Team T
 Tr: Students Training / Trainees
 KTR: Prospective Students Training / Candidate Trainees

The preliminary round for Trainees and Candidates Trainee 
This tournament will take place on July 23, 2016 in JKT48 Theater.

The final round

Match results 
Total 'senbatsu' was an experience as a member of  senbatsu is calculated from the first single with a major label, "RIVER" to single 13th "Hanya Lihat Ke Depan". Experience singing the B side are not counted.

Trivia 
 JKT48 Member who win Janken Competition single to 14th, has the opportunity to participate in the tournament Janken to be carried out by AKB48 in Kobe World Memorial Hall, Kobe, Prefecture, Japan on October 10, 2016.
 Rezky Wiranti Dhike (Team J) did not participate in this event due to her graduation from JKT48 in September 2016 coming. 
 Helma Sonya (Trainee Candidate) attended Trainee and Trainee Candidate qualifying round for "JKT48 Janken Tournament" this year, but unfortunately still not active JKT48 activities. 
 Sanda (prospective students training) did not attend the final round of Janken Competition is due to sickness
 During the process janken competition takes place, Jeje (Team J) represented by Michelle (cousin of Jeje).
 Master Senbatsu JKT48 losers/knocked out at this event are:
 Team J: Ayana, Beby, Veranda, Melody, Nabilah and Shania
 Team KIII: Yupi and Viny
 Team T: Michelle
 For the first time in history JKT48, Lisa is a 4th generation member of student training successfully entered  senbatsu  to the main track on singles JKT48.
 Announcement of the other, there would be grand reshuffle (major overhaul) held at the festival to shake hands  (Handshake Festival)  from 13th single "Mae Shika Mukanee (Hanya Lihat Kedepan)" on September 11, 2016 in the Granada Ballroom, Menara 165, Jl. TB Simatupang Kav. 1 Cilandak Timur, Pasar Minggu, South Jakarta.
 Senbatsu winners will sing the 14th single JKT48 is "Love Trip" which is the reproduction from the 45th single LOVE TRIP / Shiawase wo Wakenasai AKB48.

References

External links 
 Official website

JKT48
Indonesian television series
Indonesian reality television series